Nyamjavyn Batbayar (born in Ulaanbaatar on April 1, 1960) is a Democratic Member of the State Great Hural, elected from the Constituency of Arkhangai.  The current parliament is his second term as a Member of the State Great Hural.

Batbayar received both his Bachelor's and master's degree from Moscow State University of Economics, Statistics, and Information Sciences.  He is also a graduate of Moscow State University's Department of Political Science.

Members of the State Great Khural
1960 births
Living people
Democratic Party (Mongolia) politicians
Moscow State University alumni